Hearts Divided is a 1936 American musical film about the real-life marriage between American Elizabeth 'Betsy' Patterson and Jérôme Bonaparte, brother of Napoleon. It stars Marion Davies and Dick Powell as the couple. The film was a remake of the 1928 Glorious Betsy, which was in turn based on the play Glorious Betsy by Rida Johnson Young. In real life, they were married in Baltimore, before sailing for Europe. Napoleon annulled the marriage, in spite of the existence of a child, and forced Jerome to marry the Princess Catharina, making him king of Westphalia. “Luckily, Hollywood treats the lovers Betsy and Jerome with a little more compassion. The couple is even granted a second chance at happiness by Claude Rains' Napoleon.”

Plot summary
In 1803, Napoleon Bonaparte wants to sell a huge swathe of land (which would become the Louisiana Territory) to the United States for $20 million. He gives his younger brother Jérôme a choice between a “goodwill” tour of the United States to assist this effort or a mission to visit Princess Catharina of Württemberg, daughter of the King of Württemberg, with marriage in mind. Jéröme chooses the United States. He meets Elizabeth Patterson, the daughter of a Baltimore banker, and woos her as M. Giroux, a French tutor, without identifying himself to her or her family. Elizabeth is also being courted by two senators and a visiting English aristocrat. The trio provides comic relief. 

They fall in love and talk about becoming M. and Mrs. Giroux. He reveals himself at a ball, to everyone’s shock, but quickly assures Betsy that he still wants to marry her.

The couple sail to France, planning to marry there. On shipboard, Napoleon confronts Betsy with the importance of an alliance with Württemberg to the fate of France and the idea that Jerome will grow to hate himself if he abandons his duty. Betsy agrees to sail back to America that night without telling Jerome anything about it. Her father and her suitors welcome her home. In France, Jerome is furious with Napoleon. Their mother intervenes and asks Napoleon to let his brother have his life to live as he pleases. 

Cut to Betsy weeping in a  gazebo. The three suitors approach and ask her to choose among them. She demurs and walks into the garden. She hears Jerome singing on the other side of the wall. He is wearing the uniform of a French sailor. They run to the garden gate and into  each others arms. Mr and Mrs Giroux will live.

Cast
 Marion Davies as Elizabeth Patterson
 Dick Powell as Captain Jerome Bonaparte
 Charles Ruggles as Senator Henry Ruggles
 Claude Rains as Napoleon Bonaparte
 Edward Everett Horton as Senator John Hathaway
 Arthur Treacher as Sir Harry
 Henry Stephenson as Charles Patterson
 Clara Blandick as Aunt Ellen Patterson
 John Larkin as Isham
 Walter Kingsford as Monsieur Pichon
 Etienne Girardot as Monsieur Du Fresne
 Halliwell Hobbes as Cambaceres
 George Irving as President Thomas Jefferson
 Beulah Bondi as Madame Letizia Bonaparte
 Philip Hurlic as Pippin
 John Elliott as James Monroe (uncredited)
 Sam McDaniel as Zachariah (uncredited)

Songs
 "My Kingdom for a Kiss (Pour Un Baiser)" - music by Harry Warren, lyrics by Al Dubin
 "Two Hearts Divided (Deux Coeurs Navrés)" - music by Harry Warren, lyrics by Al Dubin
 "Nobody Knows the Trouble I've Seen"
 "Rise Up Children and Shine" (cut from final release)

References

External links
 
 
 
 Hearts Divided at TCM.com

1936 films
1930s romantic musical films
1930s historical musical films
American historical musical films
American musical drama films
American romantic drama films
American romantic musical films
American biographical films
American black-and-white films
Warner Bros. films
Sound film remakes of silent films
Remakes of American films
American films based on plays
Films directed by Frank Borzage
Films scored by Erich Wolfgang Korngold
Films set in the 1800s
Films set in Baltimore
Films produced by Frank Borzage
Depictions of Napoleon on film
Cultural depictions of Thomas Jefferson
Cultural depictions of James Monroe
American historical romance films
1930s English-language films
1930s American films